The Cambridgeshire Rowing Association (CRA) is based in Cambridge, UK. It is the administrative body for non-college rowing in Cambridge and since 1868 has organised races such as the CRA Bumps as well as looking after the interests of local rowing by providing facilities and regular meetings to discuss issues.

Affiliated Clubs

See also 
Cambridge University Boat Club

External links
Cambridge Rowing Wiki
Cambridgeshire Rowing Association

Cambridge town rowing clubs
Rowing in Cambridge
Rowing in England